Elizabeth Moir Tenduf-La, MBE is a British educationist in Sri Lanka. She founded the Colombo International School, British School in Colombo and the Elizabeth Moir School.

Education
Elizabeth Moir read mathematics at Oxford, where she captained the Oxford University Women’s Tennis team which beat Cambridge University 16 to 1 in 1961. She stayed on at Oxford to complete the Diploma in Education.

Career
Soon after, she joined the Diocesan Girls’ School in Hong Kong where she established the A Level Mathematics Department. She also played the flute in two orchestras in Hong Kong. After four years in Asia, Mrs Moir returned to England where she worked as an IBM systems analyst in the City of London working on networks for some of the major international banks

In 1982, she came to Sri Lanka, with her husband, Kesang Tenduf-La, and three children, Tashi, Sonam and Chhimi, and founded the Colombo International School. Using the British curriculum and offering London O and A Level examinations, its main clientele was Sri Lankan parents who would otherwise have sent their children overseas to be educated. The fees were very modest and the doors were opened once again for Sri Lankan students to have a first-class English medium education. The school also managed to get the British Examination Departments to set O and A Level Sinhala examinations. During the unrest of the late 1980s, CIS continued to operate, with classes being held in different homes.

In 1990, Mrs Moir was requested by President Premadasa to run a multimedia English language programme on television and radio to give the rural people an equal opportunity to learn the English language that their counterparts in the towns enjoyed. She invited Barbara Goldsmith, a former Head of BBC English, to work with her. Her team bought the English language programme Follow Me from the BBC and used this with introductions in Sinhala and Tamil on the state radio and television at prime time. They had 80 language centres across the country from Jaffna in the North to Matara in the South, and held written and spoken English examinations set by the University of Warwick.

She then moved on to found the British School in Colombo in 1994. She put together a group of trustees that included Lord Jack Butterworth, the first Vice Chancellor of Warwick University, Sir Frank Layfield QR and Dr Alistair Smith, the Overseas Representative of Aberdeen University.

Mrs Moir started the Elizabeth Moir School in 1996. The school was quoted in The Daily Telegraph as having the third best IGCSE results outside of the UK in 2012.

Honors
In June 2014 Mrs Elizabeth Moir Tenduf-La was appointed a Member of the Order of the British Empire for her services to British Education and the teaching of English in Sri Lanka.  This award was presented to her at Windsor Castle in July 2015 by Her Majesty the Queen.

Notes 

References

External links
Elizabeth Moir School

Sri Lankan educational theorists
Year of birth missing (living people)
Living people
Alumni of the University of Oxford
People from Shimla
People educated at St Mary's School, Calne
Indian women educational theorists